Archie McFeat (23 January 1924 – 1 April 1996) was a Scottish professional footballer, who played as a goalkeeper.

He played for Morton and Dumbarton before switching to English football, moving to Torquay United, although he only made nine appearances for the club. In his last game for Torquay, McFeat was knocked unconscious by a shot from Frank Neary in the 3–1 defeat at Leyton Orient on 20 November 1948.

Returning to Scotland, McFeat joined Albion Rovers. In November 1952 he was signed by Falkirk manager Bob Shankly, and stayed with the Bairns until 1954, when he joined Stenhousemuir.

References

1924 births
1996 deaths
Scottish footballers
Greenock Morton F.C. players
Dumbarton F.C. players
Torquay United F.C. players
Albion Rovers F.C. players
Falkirk F.C. players
Stenhousemuir F.C. players
Scottish Football League players
English Football League players
Association football goalkeepers
Footballers from Stirling